Wagyu (Hepburn: wagyū) is the collective name for the four principal Japanese breeds of beef cattle. All wagyū cattle derive from cross-breeding in the early twentieth century of native Japanese cattle with imported stock, mostly from Europe.

In several areas of Japan, Wagyu beef is shipped carrying area names. Some examples are Matsusaka beef, Kobe beef, Yonezawa beef, Ōmi beef, and Sanda beef. In recent years, Wagyu beef has increased in fat percentage due to a decrease in grazing and an increase in using feed, resulting in larger, fattier cattle.

History 

Cattle were brought to Japan from China at the same time as the cultivation of rice, in about the second century AD, in the Yayoi period. Until about the time of the Meiji Restoration in 1868, they were used only as draught animals, in agriculture, forestry, mining and for transport, and as a source of fertilizer. Milk consumption was unknown, and – for cultural and religious reasons – meat was not eaten. Cattle were highly prized and valuable, too expensive for a poor farmer to buy.

Japan was effectively isolated from the rest of the world from 1635 until 1854; there was no possibility of the intromission of foreign genes to the cattle population during this time. Between  1868, the year of the Meiji Restoration, and 1887, some 2600 foreign cattle were imported. At first, there was little interest in cross-breeding these with the native stock, but from about 1900, it became widespread. It ceased abruptly in 1910 when it was realised that, while the cross-breeds might be larger and have better dairy qualities, their working capacity and meat quality was lower. From 1919, the various heterogeneous regional populations that resulted from this brief period of cross-breeding were registered and selected as "Improved Japanese Cattle". Four separate strains were characterised, based mainly on which type of foreign cattle had most influenced the hybrids, and were recognised as individual breeds in 1944. They are collectively known as wagyū, and are:

 The Japanese Black (kuroge washu), which constitutes over 90% of beef cattle in Japan; regional strains within the breed include the Tottori, Tajima, Shimane and Okayama.
 The Japanese Brown or Japanese Red (akage washu or akaushi), the other main breed, representing about 5% of all beef cattle; reared in southern Japan, in Kōchi Prefecture on Shikoku island, and in Kumamoto Prefecture on Kyushu island.
 The Japanese Polled (mukaku washu), found principally in Yamaguchi Prefecture
 The Japanese Shorthorn (nihon tankaku washu), reared in northern Japan, mainly in Iwate Prefecture; it constitutes less than one percent of all wagyu cattle.

Australia 

The Australian Wagyu Association is the largest breed association outside Japan. Both fullblood and Wagyu-cross cattle are farmed in Australia for domestic and overseas markets, including Taiwan, China, Canada, Hong Kong, Singapore, Malaysia, Indonesia, the U.K., France, Germany, Denmark and the U.S. Australian Wagyu cattle are grain fed for the last 300–500 days of production. Wagyu bred in Western Australia's Margaret River region often have red wine added to their feed as well.

United States 

In the United States, some Japanese Wagyu cattle are cross-bred with American Angus stock. Meat from this cross-breed is marketed as "American-Style Kobe Beef", or "Wangus", although many American retailers simply (inaccurately) refer to it as Wagyu. Wagyu were first competitively exhibited at the National Western Stock Show in 2012. Other U.S. Wagyu breeders have full-blooded animals directly descended from original Japanese bloodlines, that are registered through the American Wagyu Association.

Canada 

Wagyu cattle farming in Canada appeared after 1991 when the Canadian Wagyu Association was formed. Wagyu style cattle and farms in Canada are found in Alberta, Saskatchewan, Ontario, Quebec, British Columbia, Prince Edward Island, and Newfoundland and Labrador. Canadian Wagyu beef products are exported to the US (including Hawaii), Australia, New Zealand, and Europe.

United Kingdom

In 2008, a herd of Wagyu cattle was imported to North Yorkshire, first becoming available for consumption in 2011. Since 2011 there have been Wagyu herds in Scotland.

The Wagyu Breeders Association Ltd was established in July 2014.

References

Further reading 
 
 

Beef cattle breeds
Cattle breeds originating in Japan
Japanese cuisine terms